Clara Tschudi (9 September 1856 – 10 November 1945) was a Norwegian writer.

She was born in Tønsberg. She is best known for her biographies of contemporary and historical women. Among her publications are the book Kvindebevægelsen, dens Udvikling og nuværende Standpunkt from 1885, and Tre Nutidskvinder from 1887, where she biographed women's rights activists Camilla Collett, Lina Morgenstern and Gertrude Guillaume-Schack. Her book Kejserinde Eugenie from 1889 was the first of as series of biographical portraits of central women of European Royal families. A German translation of her book on Empress Elisabeth of Austria was subsequently forbidden in Austria. She resided in Gausdal, and died in November 1945.

References

External links

 

1856 births
1945 deaths
Writers from Tønsberg
Norwegian biographers
Norwegian women writers
Norwegian women's rights activists
People from Gausdal
Women biographers
Norwegian Association for Women's Rights people
Litteris et Artibus recipients